Jon Nite (born March 19, 1980) is a Grammy-nominated, CMA and ACM award winning singer/songwriter who has written 16 No.1 hits. Nite's songs have been recorded by artists such as Charlie Puth, Keith Urban, Dan & Shay, Gabby Barrett, Luke Bryan, Brandi Carlile, Tim McGraw, Miranda Lambert, Kenny Chesney, Phillip Phillips, Dierks Bentley, Chase Rice, Jake Owen, Michael Ray, Brett Young, Darius Rucker, Dustin Lynch, and more. Jon Nite co-wrote the cross-over smash hit, “I Hope (feat. Charlie Puth)” by Gabby Barrett. “I Hope” was a record breaking #1 on not only the Billboard Country Airplay + Hot Country Songs charts as well as a #1 at Top 40, #2 on Hot AC, #3 on Hot 100, + 6x RIAA Platinum certified song in 2022. It received both ACM + CMA nominations for Single of the Year + was the best selling country song of 2020 in the US. Other accolades include Nite’s 2019 Grammy nomination for Best Country Song with Cole Swindell's single "Break Up in the End" which also topped the Country Aircheck chart. In addition, Jon has found a radio home with #1 hits like “We Were Us” by Keith Urban and Miranda Lambert, “What She Wants Tonight,” “Knockin’ Boots,” + “Strip It Down” by Luke Bryan, “Beachin’” by Jake Owen, “Living” by Dierks Bentley, “Lady” by Brett Young, “Whatever She’s Got” by David Nail, “Smoke” by A Thousand Horses, “Break On Me” by Keith Urban, "Noise" by Kenny Chesney, “Think A Little Less” by Michael Ray, “If I Told You” by Darius Rucker, "Boy" by Lee Brice, and more. Jon has also had success in the sync world with placements such as The Shack (2017 film), Grey’s Anatomy, True Blood, CSI, The Vampire Diaries, One Tree Hill, Mob Wives, Private Practice, + SEC Football.

Biography

Early life 
Born and raised in Amarillo, Texas, Nite first started songwriting after he saw an ad on TV for a songwriting competition which his friends "dared" him to enter.

“I sent it in. They liked it. All the critiques were relatively encouraging, like maybe you should move to Nashville,” he explained in a 2016 interview with Songwriter Universe. “Some kind songwriter back in the ’90s was listening to my horrible first song and giving me a pep talk. I just got hooked. I started writing as much as possible.”

Following the judges advice, he moved to Nashville from Amarillo when he was 18 years old with his wife and baby, surviving on food stamps and living in a tiny apartment. He explained “I could be poor in Amarillo, Texas or I could be poor in Nashville and at least be close to something that potentially I could have a dream at”. Nite studied at Belmont University's music school from which he eventually graduated.

Early career 
As Nite began collaborating with different writers, he was introduced to Sony Music Publishing songwriter Ross Copperman, and they wrote their first song together, “Glass”, which was cut by country duo Thompson Square and featured on their 2011 self-titled debut album. It became Nite's first hit as a songwriter, peaking at No. 15 on Billboard's Hot Country Songs chart.

Alongside Copperman, Jon Nite forged his career and created his next few hits, including Dierks Bentley's 2012 top five Country Airplay hit “Tip It On Back”. Nite has since scored a number of other hits writing with Copperman, including Luke Bryan’s Hot Country Songs and Country Airplay No. 1 “Strip It Down”, A Thousand Horses’ Country Airplay chart-topper “Smoke”, Keith Urban's Airplay No. 1 “Break On Me”, Darius Rucker’s Airplay chart-topper “If I Told You" and Kenny Chesney’s Top 10 hit “Noise”.

Another regular co-writer has been Jimmy Robbins. Together, they've written Keith Urban and Miranda Lambert’s “We Were Us” and Jake Owen’s “Beachin’” (co-written with Jaren Johnston). Both songs reached No. 1 on the Hot Country Songs and Country Airplay charts. His other collaborations with Robbins include David Nail’s Country Airplay chart-topping “Whatever She’s Got” as well as Chase Rice's “Gonna Wanna Tonight” and Michael Ray's “Think A Little Less”, which both peaked at No. 2 on the Country Airplay charts. Alongside Josh Osborne, the pair also wrote Tim McGraw's top five Airplay hit “Top Of The World”.

Present career 
Among the other artists Nite has had songs recorded by are Frankie Ballard, Lee Brice, The Three, Brett Eldredge, Love and Theft, Maddie and Tae, Chase Rice, Dallas Smith, Cole Swindell, Leah Turner and Waterloo Revival.

His awards include a CMA Triple Play honor, which he received for writing three No. 1 hits in a calendar year (“Smoke”, “Strip It Down” and “Break On Me”).

Nite additionally earned a 2019 Grammy nomination for Best Country Song, an ACM Nomination for Country Song of the Year, and an NSAI award for Song of the Year following his work on Cole Swindell's chart-topping ballad "Break Up In The End". Nite's recent No.1s include: “I Hope” by Gabby Barrett, “What She Wants Tonight” by Luke Bryan, and “Living” by Dierks Bentley.

Jon Nite is a Grammy-nominated, CMA and ACM award winning singer/songwriter who has written 16 No.1 hits. Nite's songs have been recorded by artists such as Tim McGraw, Dierks Bentley, Keith Urban, Luke Bryan, Kenny Chesney, Gabby Barrett, Charlie Puth, Brandi Carlile, Phillip Phillips, Chase Rice, Jake Owen, Michael Ray, Brett Young, Darius Rucker, Dustin Lynch, and more. In 2019 "Break Up in the End" by Cole Swindell lead Nite to receive a Grammy Nomination for Best Country Song, an ACM Nomination for Country Song of the Year, and an NSAI award for Song of the Year. Nite's recent No.1s include: “I Hope” by Gabby Barrett, “What She Wants Tonight” by Luke Bryan, “Break Up in the End” by Cole Swindell and “Living” by Dierks Bentley.

#1 Hits 

 "Strip It Down" – Recorded by Luke Bryan 
 "Break On Me" – Recorded by Keith Urban
 "We Were Us" – Recorded by Keith Urban and Miranda Lambert 
 "Beachin’" – Recorded by Jake Owen
 "Whatever She's Got" – Recorded by David Nail
 "Smoke" – Recorded by A Thousand Horses
 "If I Told You" – Recorded by Darius Rucker
 "Think A Little Less" – Recorded by Michael Ray 
 "Wasting Gas" – Recorded by Dallas Smith
 "Break Up In The End" – Recorded by Cole Swindell
 "Living" - Recorded by Dierks Bentley
 "I Hope" – Recorded by Gabby Barrett
"What She Wants Tonight" – Recorded by Luke Bryan
"Lady" – Recorded by Brett Young

Songwriting discography 
Singles

References

Living people
Songwriters from Texas
Musicians from Amarillo, Texas
1980 births